Iolaus menas, the blue savanna sapphire, is a butterfly in the family Lycaenidae. The species was first described by Hamilton Herbert Druce in 1890. It is found in Senegal, the Gambia, Burkina Faso, Guinea, Ivory Coast, Ghana, Nigeria, Cameroon, Sudan, Ethiopia, Uganda and Kenya. The habitat consists of savanna.

The larvae feed on Loranthus species and Tapinanthus bangwensis.

Subspecies
Iolaus menas menas (Senegal, Gambia, Burkina Faso, Guinea, Ivory Coast, Ghana, northern Nigeria, northern Cameroon, southern Sudan, Ethiopia)
Iolaus menas tatiana (d'Abrera, 1980) (northern Uganda, northern Kenya)

References

External links

Die Gross-Schmetterlinge der Erde 13: Die Afrikanischen Tagfalter. Plate XIII 67 d, g female var.

Butterflies described in 1890
Iolaus (butterfly)
Butterflies of Africa